The 175th Battalion, CEF, was a unit in the Canadian Expeditionary Force during the First World War.

History 
Based in Medicine Hat, Alberta, the unit began recruiting during the winter of 1915/16 in the Medicine Hat district. After sailing to England in October 1916, the battalion was absorbed into the 21st Reserve Battalion on January 10, 1917. The 175th Battalion, CEF, had one officer commanding: Lieutenant-Colonel Nelson Spencer.

Battle Honours 
In 1929, the battalion was awarded the theatre of war honour .

Perpetuation 
Perpetuation of the 175th Battalion was assigned to The Alberta Regiment in 1920. When this regiment split in two in 1924, the South Alberta Regiment carried the perpetuation. The South Alberta Regiment merged into the South Alberta Light Horse (29th Armoured Regiment) in 1954, and this regiment (now simply the South Alberta Light Horse) carries on the perpetuation of the 175th Battalion.

See also 

 List of infantry battalions in the Canadian Expeditionary Force

References 

 

Battalions of the Canadian Expeditionary Force
Medicine Hat
South Alberta Light Horse
South Alberta Regiment